Buenfil is a surname. Notable people with the surname include:

Alberto Ruz Buenfil (born 1945), Mexican activist 
Erika Buenfil (born 1963), Mexican actress, television host, and singer